PariWar is an Indian comedy series created for Disney+ Hotstar by Arre Studios starring Gajraj Rao, Ranvir Shorey, Yashpal Sharma, Sadiya Siddiqui, Nidhi Singh and Vijay Raaz. The series was premiered on Disney+ Hotstar on September 23, 2020.

Premise 
The series revolves around a family squabbling over a lucrative property which was donated to a theatre artist to build home for widowers.

Cast 

 Gajraj Rao as Kashiram Narayan
 Ranvir Shorey as Shishupal Narayan
 Yashpal Sharma as Mahipal Narayan
 Sadiya Siddiqui as Anju
 Nidhi Singh as Mandakini Narayan aka Guddan
 Anurita Jha as Manju
 Vijay Raaz as Gangaram Tripathi 
 Abhishek Banerjee as Kanta Prasad Tripathi aka Munna
 Kumar Varun as Babloo
 Abhishek Singh as Patwari
 Neena Gupta as Kadambari (Special Appearance)
 Ajay Singh as Lalla Ram 6 episode

Production 
In September 2019, Hotstar commissioned the project from Arre Studios attaching Sagar Ballary to direct the project and with multiple actors joining the cast.

Episodes

Release 
The series premiered on Disney+ Hotstar on September 23, 2020. The series is available for free for all the subscribers and non subscribers as well.

Reception 
SpotboyE wrote This Rib Tickling Web Series Is A Must-Watch giving 4/5 stars. LetsOTT wrote that Decent family drama lit up by the cast.

References

External links 

Hindi-language Disney+ Hotstar original programming
2020 Indian television series debuts
Indian comedy television series
Hindi-language television shows
Indian television series based on non-Indian television series